Sir Hugh Innes, 1st Baronet ( – 16 August 1831) was a Scottish politician.

Innes was the oldest surviving son of Rev. Hugh Innes of Calton, Glasgow and Jean, daughter of Thomas Graham. He was educated at the University of Glasgow.

He became a wealthy landowner, possibly having made his money in trade.

He was the Member of Parliament (MP) for Ross-shire from 1809 to 1812,
for Ross-shire from 1812 to 1830,
for Sutherland from May 1831 until his death in August 1831.

Announced on 7 December 1818, Innes was created a baronet on 28 April 1819, of Lochalsh and Coxton in the County of Moray.
However, he never married and died childless, so the baronetcy became extinct on his death.
No will was ever found.

References

External links 
 

1764 births
Year of birth uncertain
1831 deaths
Alumni of the University of Glasgow
Scottish landowners
Baronets in the Baronetage of the United Kingdom
Members of the Parliament of the United Kingdom for Scottish constituencies
UK MPs 1807–1812
UK MPs 1812–1818
UK MPs 1818–1820
UK MPs 1820–1826
UK MPs 1826–1830
UK MPs 1831–1832